Alerian, based in Dallas, TX, is an independent company that provides transparent master limited partnerships (MLP) and energy infrastructure benchmarks and analytics. The flagship Alerian MLP Index (AMZ) is used by industry professionals to analyze relative performance.

As of September 30, 2015, Alerian indicated that total assets of exchanged-traded products linked to the Alerian Index Series exceeded $13 billion.

History
Alerian was founded in 2004 by Gabriel Hammond as an MLP asset manager. In 2005, Kenny Feng joined the company and headed the creation and launch of the Alerian MLP Index (NYSE: AMZ), the first real-time index of master limited partnerships (MLPs).The AMZ is now broadly considered to be the benchmark for the asset class.

In 2007, the company relocated from the Big Apple (New York, NY) to the Big D (Dallas, TX). In March 2010, Alerian spun off its active management business as SteelPath Capital Management LLC. At that point, Kenny Feng took over as President and CEO.

Indices

The Alerian Index Series is primarily used by investors for performance benchmarking and by exchange-traded product issuers for the creation of index tracking funds.

About the Alerian MLP Index

The Alerian MLP Index is the leading gauge of energy Master Limited Partnerships (MLPs). The float-adjusted, capitalization-weighted index, whose 50 constituents represent approximately 75% of total market capitalization, is disseminated real-time on a price-return basis (AMZ) and on a total-return basis (AMZX).

About the Alerian MLP Infrastructure Index

The Alerian MLP Infrastructure Index is a composite of energy infrastructure Master Limited Partnerships (MLPs). The capped, float-adjusted, capitalization-weighted index, whose constituents earn the majority of their cash flow from the pipeline transportation, gathering, processing, and storage of energy commodities, is disseminated real-time on a price-return basis (AMZI) and on a total-return basis (AMZIX).

About the Alerian Energy Infrastructure Index

The Alerian Energy Infrastructure Index is a composite of North American energy infrastructure companies. The index, whose constituents are engaged in the pipeline transportation, gathering, processing, and storage of energy commodities, is disseminated real-time on a price-return basis (AMEI) and on a total-return basis (AMEIX).

About the Alerian MLP Equal Weight Index

The Alerian MLP Equal Weight Index is the equal-weighted version of the widely used Alerian MLP Index (AMZ). The index, which includes the same 50 companies as the float-adjusted, capitalization-weighted AMZ but allocates a 2% weight to each constituent at each rebalancing, is disseminated real-time on a price-return basis (AMZE) and on a total-return basis (AMZEX).

About the Alerian Natural Gas MLP Index

The Alerian Natural Gas MLP Index is a composite of natural gas infrastructure Master Limited Partnerships (MLPs). The equal-weighted index, whose 20 constituents earn the majority of their cash flow from the pipeline transportation, gathering, processing, and storage of natural gas and natural gas liquids (NGLs), is disseminated real-time on a price-return basis (ANGI) and end-of-day on a total-return basis (ANGIX).

Alerian Large Cap MLP Index

The Alerian Large Cap MLP Index is a composite of large-cap energy Master Limited Partnerships (MLPs). The equal-weighted index, which includes the 15 largest companies by market capitalization, is disseminated end-of-day on a price-return basis (ALCI) and on a total-return basis (ALCIX).

Linked Products
Alerian licenses its indices to third parties for the creation of investment vehicles, such as exchange-traded funds (ETFs) and exchange-traded notes (ETNs), separately managed accounts, and structured products. These products provide investors with access to MLPs and energy infrastructure without the administrative burden associated with K-1 forms.

Alerian MLP ETF (NYSE: AMLP) AMLP, launched in August 2010, was the first MLP ETF and is designed to track an investment in the Alerian MLP Infrastructure Index (AMZI). Investors receive a quarterly dividend linked to the cash distributions paid by the Master Limited Partnerships (MLPs) in the index, less accrued tracking fees. A portion of each quarterly payment is treated as return of capital for tax purposes, with the remaining portion treated as a qualified dividend.

Alerian Energy Infrastructure ETF (NYSE: ENFR) ENFR was launched in November 2013 and is designed to track an investment in the Alerian Energy Infrastructure Index (AMEI). Investors receive a quarterly dividend linked to the cash distributions paid by the energy infrastructure MLPs and corporations in the index, less accrued tracking fees.

ALPS Alerian MLP Infrastructure Index Fund (NYSE: ALERX) ALERX was launched in December 2012 and is designed to track an investment in the Alerian MLP Infrastructure Index (AMZI). Investors receive a quarterly dividend linked to the cash distributions paid by the Master Limited Partnerships (MLPs) in the index, less accrued tracking fees. A portion of each quarterly payment is treated as return of capital for tax purposes, with the remaining portion treated as a qualified dividend.

ALPS | Alerian Energy Infrastructure Portfolio (NYSE: ALEFX) ALEFX, launched in April 2013, was the first MLP and energy infrastructure variable insurance product. It is designed to track an investment in the Alerian Energy Infrastructure Index (AMEI).

CIBC Alerian MLP Infrastructure Index-Linked ROC Notes CIBC has issued series of return-of-capital notes linked to the Alerian MLP Infrastructure Index since October 2010. Thirty-one series have been issued as of October 16, 2015. The notes provide investors with partial repayments of principal each quarter linked to the cash distributions paid by the MLPs in the index, less accrued tracking fees and converted into Canadian dollars. The notes are debt obligations of CIBC.

JPMorgan Alerian MLP Index ETN (NYSE: AMJ) AMJ, launched in April 2009, is designed to track an investment in the Alerian MLP Index (AMZ). Investors receive a quarterly coupon linked to the cash distributions paid by the MLPs in the index, less accrued tracking fees. The ETNs are senior, unsecured obligations of JPMorgan Chase & Co.

UBS ETRACS Alerian MLP Index ETN (NYSE: AMU) AMU, launched in July 2012, is designed to track an investment in the Alerian MLP Index (AMZ). Investors receive a quarterly coupon linked to the cash distributions paid by the MLPs in the index, less accrued tracking fees. The ETNs are senior, unsecured obligations of UBS AG.

UBS ETRACS Alerian MLP Infrastructure Index ETN (NYSE: MLPI) MLPI, launched in April 2010, is designed to track an investment in the Alerian MLP Infrastructure Index (AMZI). Investors receive a quarterly coupon linked to the cash distributions paid by the MLPs in the index, less accrued tracking fees. The ETNs are senior, unsecured obligations of UBS AG.

UBS ETRACS 2x Leveraged Long Alerian MLP Infrastructure Index ETN (NYSE: MLPL) MLPL, launched in July 2010, is designed to track a leveraged investment in the Alerian MLP Infrastructure Index (AMZI). Investors receive a quarterly coupon linked to the leveraged cash distributions paid by the MLPs in the index, less financing costs and accrued tracking fees. The ETNs are senior, unsecured obligations of UBS AG.

UBS ETRACS Alerian Natural Gas MLP Index ETN (NYSE: MLPG) MLPG, launched in July 2010, is designed to track an investment in the Alerian Natural Gas MLP Index (ANGI). Investors receive a quarterly coupon linked to the cash distributions paid by the MLPs in the index, less accrued tracking fees. The ETNs are senior, unsecured obligations of UBS AG.

Governance
Alerian does not earn revenue from underwriting or other investment banking fees, nor does it actively manage a portfolio of MLP and energy infrastructure securities on behalf of clients. Consequently, the company is able to provide objective benchmarks. An independent advisory board of MLP and energy infrastructure executives, legal partners, and senior financial professionals reviews all methodology modifications and constituent changes to ensure that they are made objectively and without bias.

References

External links
 Official website

Investment companies of the United States
American companies established in 2004
Companies based in Dallas
Financial services companies established in 2004